Paton Field is located on Telegraph Road, in Thurstaston, Wirral Peninsula, England. The stadium is the home of Caldy RFC.

References

External links 
 Official Caldy RFC website

Buildings and structures in the Metropolitan Borough of Wirral
Rugby union stadiums in England